Rena is a 1938 Polish drama film directed by Michał Waszyński.

Cast
Stanisława Angel-Engelówna ...  Rena Laska 
Mieczysław Cybulski ...  Janusz Garda 
Tekla Trapszo ...  Mother Laska 
Kazimierz Junosza-Stępowski...  Prosecutor Garda 
Loda Niemirzanka ...  Kazia, the blond 
Jacek Woszczerowicz ...  Uncle Ryszard Garda 
Józef Węgrzyn ...  Szalski, the store director 
Stanisław Sielański ...  Wasik, toy department clerk 
Janina Krzymuska ...  The Washer Woman 
Jadwiga Bukojemska ...  Klientka domu towarowego 
Jerzy Chodecki   
Halina Cieszkowska   
Tadeusz Pilarski   
Irena Skwierczyńska  
Zbigniew Ziembinski

External links 
 

1938 films
1930s Polish-language films
Polish black-and-white films
Films directed by Michał Waszyński
1938 crime drama films
Films based on Polish novels
Polish crime drama films